Ciconia lydekkeri is an extinct species of stork from the Middle and Late Pleistocene of Brazil, Bolivia and Argentina.

Florentino Ameghino named the species after British paleontologist Richard Lydekker, whom first described bones discovered in caves near Lagoa Santa, Minas Gerais, Brazil.

Ciconia maltha has been considered to be a synonym of this species and, if accepted, would increase its range to include United States and Cuba.

References

External links 
 
 

Ciconiidae
Pleistocene birds
Quaternary birds of South America
Pleistocene Argentina
Fossils of Argentina
Pleistocene Bolivia
Fossils of Bolivia
Pleistocene Brazil
Fossils of Brazil
Fossil taxa described in 1891
Taxa named by Florentino Ameghino
Storks